The Woodlands Swim Team (TWST) is a swim club based out of The Woodlands, Texas. The team has sent twenty-five swimmers to the Olympic trials, holds numerous TAGS (Texas Age Group Swimming) records, and has won 39 of 50 TAGS state championships since 1973. TWST is led by Head Coach Jarrod Murphy.  TWST is a member of USA Swimming.

 TWST swimmers competing at a national level include: Michael McBroom Kelsey Amundsen and Gray Umbach.

History
The team started in 1975, training at The Woodlands Athletic Club (WAC), but has since moved to the CISD Natatorium in nearby Shenandoah, TX.

References

Swim teams in the United States
Swimming organizations
Swimming in Texas
Sports clubs established in 1973
1973 establishments in Texas
The Woodlands, Texas
Sports in the Houston metropolitan area